Maculauger is a genus of marine snails, gastropod mollusks in the family Terebridae, subfamily Terebrinae.

Species
Species within the genus Maculauger include:
 Maculauger alveolatus (Hinds, 1844)
 Maculauger campbelli (R. D. Burch, 1965)
 Maculauger castigatus (A. H. Cooke, 1885)
 Maculauger cinctellus (Deshayes, 1859)
 Maculauger kokiy Pacaud & Lesport, 2020
 Maculauger minipulcher (Bozzetti, 2008)
 Maculauger sudchinensis Malcolm, Terryn & Fedosov, 2020
Species brought into synonymy
 Maculauger pseudopertusus (Bratcher & Cernohorsky, 1985): synonym of Maculauger kokiy Pacaud & Lesport, 2020

References

External links
 Fedosov, A. E.; Malcolm, G.; Terryn, Y.; Gorson, J.; Modica, M. V.; Holford, M.; Puillandre, N. (2020). Phylogenetic classification of the family Terebridae (Neogastropoda: Conoidea). Journal of Molluscan Studies

Terebridae